William Morris Davis (August 16, 1815August 5, 1891), was an abolitionist, author and a Republican member of the U.S. House of Representatives from Pennsylvania. Among his friends were the New York sculptor Henry Kirke Brown, and the lock inventor Linus Yale.

Biography
William Morris Davis was born in Keene Valley, New York.  He moved to Pennsylvania and became a sugar refiner in Philadelphia.  Davis was elected as a Republican to the Thirty-seventh Congress. He was elected as a member to the American Philosophical Society in 1883.

He died in Keene Valley in 1891.  Interment in Friends Fair Hill Burial Ground in Germantown, Pennsylvania.

Works
Nimrod of the Sea or The American Whaleman – AOSTON (Harper & Bros., New York 1874)

Sources

The Political Graveyard

References

Bibliography
William Morris Davis (1815–1891) : the story of a nineteenth century American – Arthur M. Johnson (Washington DC, 1951)

External links
 The Davis, Brown, and Yale Families Correspondence, including personal letters from William Morris Davis, are available for research use at the Historical Society of Pennsylvania.

1815 births
1891 deaths
Republican Party members of the United States House of Representatives from Pennsylvania
19th-century American politicians